The Old Man is a stand-alone thriller novel by Thomas Perry, published by the Mysterious Press imprint of Grove Atlantic in January 2017.

Synopsis 
Former army intelligence officer Michael Kohler, who now goes by the name Dan Chase, lives in Norwich, Vermont with his two dogs. However, he has been in hiding for most of his adult life after absconding with $20 million during a mission in Libya.

Reception 
Publishers Weekly called it an "engrossing if not flawless thriller." They also praised the "refreshing" unconventionality of an older action protagonist and the novel's "palpable" tension. However, they criticized the "contrived and unnecessary" backstory of a secondary character.

Kirkus Reviews called it "Swift, unsentimental, and deeply satisfying."

The novel was nominated for the 2018 Barry Award for Best Thriller.

Television adaptation 

The novel was developed into a television series of the same name by Jonathan E. Steinberg and Robert Levine, with Jeff Bridges starring as the lead. The series premiered in the U.S. on FX on Hulu on June 16, 2022.

References

Further reading 
 Ott, Bill. 2017, "The Old Man", The Booklist, vol. 113, no. 9, pp. 46.
 

2017 American novels
American thriller novels
American novels adapted into television shows
Mysterious Press books
Novels set in Vermont